Pseudofentonia is a genus of moths of the family Notodontidae erected by Embrik Strand in 1912.

Species
Subgenus Pseudofentonia Strand, 1912
Pseudofentonia argentifera  (Moore, [1866]) 
Subgenus Calyptronotum Roepke, 1944
Pseudofentonia ocularis Semper, 1898
Pseudofentonia gualberta Schaus, 1928
Subgenus Viridifentonia Nakamura, 1974
Pseudofentonia plagiviridis  (Moore, 1879) 
Subgenus Eufentonia Matsumura, 1922
Pseudofentonia emiror Schintlmeister, 1989
Pseudofentonia nakamurai Sugi, 1990
Pseudofentonia nihonica  (Wileman, 1911) 
Subgenus Lanna Kemal & Koçak, 2005
Pseudofentonia medioalbida Nakamura, 1973
Pseudofentonia nigrofasciata  (Wileman, 1910) 
Subgenus Disparia Nagano, 1916
Pseudofentonia diluta Hampson, 1910
Pseudofentonia dua Schintlmeister, 1997
Pseudofentonia grisescens Gaede, 1934
Pseudofentonia mediopallens  (Sugi, 1989) 
Pseudofentonia obliquiplaga  (Moore, 1879) 
Pseudofentonia sundana  (Roepke, 1944) 
Subgenus Vietnamina Kemal & Koçak, 2005
Pseudofentonia tiga Schintlmeister, 1997
Subgenus Polystictina Kiriakoff, 1968
Pseudofentonia maculata  (Moore, 1879) 
Subgenus Epistauropus Gaede, 1930  (formerly in Neodrymonia)
Pseudofentonia singapura Gaede, 1930
Pseudofentonia terminalis (Kiriakoff, 1963) 
Subgenus unknown
Pseudofentonia walshiae Roepke 1944

References

 , 2005: Nomenclatural notes on various taxa of the moths (Lepidoptera). Centre for Entomological Studies Ankara, Miscellaneous Papers 91/92: 11-14.
 , 1996: Moths of Vietnam with special reference to Mt.Fan-si-pan, Teil 1. Entomofauna Suppl. 9: 33-248.
 , 2008, Palaearctic Macrolepidoptera Volume 1: 1-482. Notodontidae

Notodontidae
Taxa named by Embrik Strand